Echinocereus coccineus (scarlet hedgehog cactus) is a species of hedgehog cactus. Its native to Northern and Central America. It grows on full sun, in sandy and well-drained soil. It can survive in hardiness zones 8–11. When mature, it reaches heights of 60 cm (24 in). The flowers are usually red, yellow, pink, purple or white. It blooms in late spring to early summer. After blooms, it has red, edible fruit.

References
https://www.gardenia.net/plant/echinocereus-coccineus

coccineus
Plants described in 1848